T. ferruginea may refer to:
 Tadorna ferruginea, the ruddy shelduck, a bird species
 Trypeta ferruginea, a fruit fly species

See also
 Ferruginea (disambiguation)